Lambda Arae (λ Ara, λ Arae) is the Bayer designation for a star in the southern constellation of Ara. The apparent visual magnitude of this star is 4.77, making it bright enough to be seen with the naked eye.

The spectrum of this star matches a stellar classification of F4 V, which places it among the category of F-type main sequence stars. It shines with 4.6 times the luminosity of the Sun. The outer atmosphere is radiating this energy at an effective temperature of 6,725 K, giving it the yellow-white hue of an F-type star. There is some evidence that this may be a binary star system consisting of two stars with identical masses.

Examination of Lambda Arae with the Spitzer Space Telescope shows an excess of infrared emission at a wavelength of 70 μm. This suggests it may be orbited by a disk of dust at a radius of more than 15 astronomical units

References

External links
 HR 6569
 Image Lambda Arae

160032
Arae, Lambda
Ara (constellation)
F-type subgiants
086486
9597
6569
Durchmusterung objects